James Edward Kenneth McKenzie (20 April 1887 – 3 May 1958) was an Australian rules footballer who played with St Kilda in the Victorian Football League (VFL).

McKenzie travelled down to Melbourne from Mooroopna each week.

Notes

External links 

1887 births
1958 deaths
Australian rules footballers from Victoria (Australia)
St Kilda Football Club players
Mooroopna Football Club players